Off West End refers to theatres in London which are not included as West End theatres. The term is a relatively recent one, coined after the similar American term "off-Broadway" (though without the same strict definition). It is usually used synonymously with the more widespread term Fringe (or, specifically, "the London Fringe"), but sometimes is also used to refer to more mainstream or commercial theatre which is located within London but outside the centre, or to especially small and non-commercial theatres located within the centre. According to London Theatre, "Smaller theatres, including many pub theatres, are called Fringe, although some of these small theatres are also called Off West End, particularly those located in the West End of London, where most of the big commercial theatres are. These small theatres can vary in size, with seating capacities of around 40 to 400."

While West End Theatres must register with the Society of London Theatre, SOLT membership for the Off West End is entirely optional and is not widespread. The industry organisation for Off West End and Fringe venues is the Society of Independent Theatres.

Venues 

Almeida Theatre
Arcola Theatre
Arts Depot
Battersea Arts Centre
Bloomsbury Theatre
Bridewell Theatre
Bush Theatre
Charing Cross Theatre
Courtyard
Donmar Warehouse
Finborough Theatre
Greenwich Theatre
Hampstead Theatre
Hoxton Hall
Jacksons Lane
Jermyn Street Theatre
King's Head Theatre
Leicester Square Theatre
Stockwell Playhouse
Lyric Hammersmith
Menier Chocolate Factory
Millfield Arts Centre
Orange Tree Theatre
The Other Palace
Oval House
The Park Theatre
The Print Room
Pleasance Theatre
Rich Mix Cultural Foundation
Riverside Studios
Rose Theatre
Royal Court
Rudolf Steiner Theatre
Shaw Theatre
Soho Theatre
Southwark Playhouse
The Albany
The Cockpit
The Yard
The Pen Theatre
Theatre Royal Stratford East
Toynbee Studios
Tricycle Theatre
Union Theatre
Upstairs at the Gatehouse
Waterloo East Theatre
Young Vic

The Offies 
The Off West End Theatre Awards, known as the Offies for short, have been awarded to Off West End theatre productions since 2011.

References